Guido De Padt (born 23 May 1954) is a Belgian politician and Senator for the Open Flemish Liberals and Democrats. Since December 2011, he also is the mayor of Geraardsbergen, an office he also held from 2001 until 2006.

He started his national career as member of the Chamber of Representatives. From December 2008 to July 2009, he was Minister of the Interior in the Van Rompuy I Government. In the Leterme II Government, he was appointed government commissioner for the internal audit of the federal government. In 2011, he replaced the socialist  as mayor of Geraardsbergen. He got national media attention as strong defender to keep the Muur van Geraardsbergen in the Tour of Flanders. His party won the 2012 local elections in Geraardsbergen with 36% of the votes, while he got 25.8% of the preference votes. In contrast with other liberal leaders in Flanders, his popularity had grown.

References

External links 

 

|-

|-

1954 births
Government ministers of Belgium
Living people
Open Vlaamse Liberalen en Democraten politicians
People from Geraardsbergen
21st-century Belgian politicians